Stephen Kenneth Donovan FLS (born 3 June 1954) is a British palaeontologist, who is at Palaeozoic and Mesozoic Macroinvertebrates, Nederlands Centrum voor Biodiversiteit - Naturalis (formerly Nationaal Natuurhistorisch Museum). He previously worked at the Department of Geology at the University of the West Indies in Kingston, Jamaica. He was awarded the Linnean Medal.

References 

1954 births
Living people
British palaeontologists